The Weekenders (also known as Disney's The Weekenders) is an American animated television series created by Doug Langdale that ran on February 26, 2000 with the last episode aired on February 29, 2004, spanning four seasons. It centers on the weekend life of four 12-year-old 7th graders: Tino, Lor, Carver, and Tish. The series originally aired on ABC (Disney's One Saturday Morning) and UPN (Disney's One Too), but was later moved to Toon Disney.

Premise
The Weekenders details the weekends of four diverse middle school students: Tino Tonitini (voiced by Jason Marsden), a humorous and somewhat neurotic Italian-American boy; Lorraine "Lor" MacQuarrie (voiced by Grey DeLisle), a tomboyish and hot-headed Scottish-American girl; Carver Rene Descartes (voiced by Phil LaMarr), a self-absorbed and fashion-conscious African-American boy who has Haitian heritage; and Petratishkovna "Tish" Katsufrakis (voiced by Kath Soucie), an artistic and bibliophilic Jewish-American girl with vaguely defined Eastern European heritage (the fictional country where she was born is identified throughout the series simply as "the Old Country.") Every episode is set over the course of a weekend, with little to no mentions of school life. Friday sets up the conflict of the episode, Saturday escalates and develops it, and the climatic third act happens on Sunday. The implied "ticking clock" is used to signify the characters running out of time and the problem must be solved before going back to school Monday.

Tino serves as a narrator of each episode, providing his own insight into what he's experiencing as well as his friends, and will sum up the moral of the story at the end, always ending with a sign off of, "Later days."

A running gag in most episodes is that when the group goes out for pizza, the restaurant they go to has a different theme each time, such as a prison, where each table is its own cell, or the American Revolution, where the waiters look like the Founding Fathers and give rousing speeches about the pizzas.

Production
The show was known for its distinctive animation style, similar to Nickelodeon's shows produced by Klasky-Csupo such as Rocket Power and As Told by Ginger, and also for being one of the few animated series where characters' outfits change from episode to episode. The series takes place in the fictional city of Bahia Bay, California ("Bahia" is Spanish for "bay"), which is based on San Diego, California where the creator lived.

Theme music
The show's theme song, "Livin' for the Weekend", was performed by Wayne Brady and written by Wayne Brady and Roger Neill.

Episodes

Broadcast and home media
The Weekenders premiered on February 26, 2000, as part of Disney's One Saturday Morning on ABC. From 2001 to 2002, it also aired as part of Disney's One Too on UPN on Sunday mornings. In September 2002, the series moved to Toon Disney, and new episodes began airing on October 19, 2003 finishing on February 29, 2004.

Reruns of the series continued to air on Toon Disney from 2004 to 2006, and also on Disney Channel in 2003.

In the United States, the entire series is now available on DVD on two volume sets sold exclusively through the Disney Movie Club, which makes The Weekenders the first Disney animated television show to have a full release on DVD. Due to the first-sale doctrine in the United States, the discs can be legally resold and are regularly available from sellers on eBay and other similar sites. As of March 15, 2022, the series is not available for streaming on Disney+.

Reception

Critical reception
The Weekenders has received very positive reviews from critics and fans for its solid writing, upbeat energy and multi-dimensional characters.

Ratings
TV Guide called The Weekenders as "the show that killed Pokémon", because ABC stole the ratings when they aired it at 10:00 am – the same time Pokémon aired on Kids' WB. In addition, Variety and the New York Post reported that The Weekenders took the number one rating on Saturday morning television, which knocked off Pokémon from its 54 consecutive weeks as the top spot.

References

External links 

 
 

2000 American television series debuts
2000s American animated television series
2004 American television series endings
ABC Kids (TV programming block)
American children's animated comedy television series
Animated television series about children
Disney's One Too
Toon Disney original programming
UPN original programming
English-language television shows
Middle school television series
Television series by Disney Television Animation
Television series created by Doug Langdale
Television shows set in San Diego County, California
Vegetarianism in fiction